Diptilon is a genus of moths in the subfamily Arctiinae. The genus was erected by Otto von Prittwitz in 1870.

Species
 Diptilon aterea Schaus, 1901
 Diptilon aurantiipes Rothschild, 1911
 Diptilon bivittata Walker, 1864
 Diptilon chrysocraspis Hampson, 1898
 Diptilon crassa Zerny, 1912
 Diptilon culex Draudt, 1915
 Diptilon doeri Schaus, 1892
 Diptilon flavipalpis Hampson, 1911
 Diptilon gladia E. D. Jones, 1914
 Diptilon halterata Fabricius, 1775
 Diptilon hoffmannsi Rothschild, 1911
 Diptilon philocles Druce, 1896
 Diptilon proleuca Druce, 1905
 Diptilon sylpha Dognin, 1902
 Diptilon telamonophorum Prittwitz, 1870

References

External links

Euchromiina
Moth genera